Denis Ignashin (Денис Игнашин, born March 31, 1988) is a Russian ice hockey player. He is currently playing with Torpedo Ust-Kamenogorsk of the Supreme Hockey League (VHL).

Ignashin played eighteen games in the Kontinental Hockey League (KHL) with HC Spartak Moscow during the 2013–14 KHL season.

References

External links

1988 births
Living people
Kazzinc-Torpedo players
HC Spartak Moscow players
Russian ice hockey forwards
People from Cherepovets
Saryarka Karagandy players
Yermak Angarsk players
HC Yugra players
Yuzhny Ural Orsk players
Sportspeople from Vologda Oblast